The Rama Prasad Goenka Group, commonly known as RPG Group, is an Indian industrial and services conglomerate headquartered in Mumbai, Maharashtra. The roots of the RPG Group can be traced back to the enterprise of Ramdutt Goenka in 1820. RPG Enterprises was established in 1979 by Rama Prasad Goenka and initially comprised the Phillips Carbon Black, Asian Cables, Agarpara Jute, and Murphy India companies. R. P. Goenka held the title of Chairman Emeritus until his death in 2013. The present chairman is Harsh Goenka, the elder son of R. P. Goenka.

Presently, the RPG Group comprises over fifteen companies in the areas of infrastructure, tyres, technology, and speciality. Some of the companies it holds are CEAT Tyres, information technology firm Zensar Technologies, infrastructure company KEC International, pharmaceutical company RPG Life Sciences, a 50/50 joint-venture with TE Connectivity for Raychem RPG, plantation company Harrisons Malayalam, and a one-stop shop for senior adults, Seniority.

Group companies
The conglomerate's major companies, subsidiaries and affiliates are divided among the following 4 sectors.

Tyres

CEAT

CEAT manufactures the largest range of tyres in India. It is the largest exporter of tyres in India, exporting to over 100 countries. The company is headquartered in Mumbai. It has manufacturing plants in Bhandup and Ambernath in Mumbai, Nashik, and Halol (near Baroda).

CEAT Sri Lanka
Entering the Sri Lankan market in 1992, CEAT India formed a joint venture with AMW, and subsequently a three-way venture with Kelani Tyres in 1999, to manufacture and market CEAT tyres in Sri Lanka. This venture resulted in the creation of CEAT Kelani Associated Holdings, formerly Kelani Tyres, which is today the largest domestic tyre manufacturer in Sri Lanka. The exit of AMW in 2009, resulted in a joint venture between CEAT Kelani Holdings and CEAT India. Commencing operations with one plant in Kalutara, the company today has three plants, including a radial plant constructed in 2006. CEAT Kelani is the single largest brand in the radial tyre segment in Sri Lanka, with a 33 percent market share.

CEAT Bangladesh 
In 2017, the conglomerate entered into a joint-venture with Bangladeshi group, A K Khan & Company, to set up a plant in Bhaluka, Mymensingh with an initial investment of US$67 million. CEAT will have a 70% stake in this joint-venture.

Infrastructure

KEC International

The company has developed power infrastructure in over 70 countries across South Asia, the Middle East and North Africa (MENA), Africa, Central Asia, and the Americas. While power transmission is its largest vertical market, the company also has a growing presence in railways, civil, urban infrastructure, solar infrastructure, and oil and gas cross-country pipelines.

SAE Towers 
In April 2010, KEC International set up the world's largest tower testing station at Butibori, in Nagpur. The new test station will facilitate validation of the largest towers ever designed for the country's futuristic Extra-High Voltage (EHV) energy network. In September 2010, KEC International acquired Houston-based SAE Towers, a group of operating companies incorporated in the United States, Mexico, and Brazil, consolidated through SAE Towers Holdings, LLC. This acquisition created the second largest steel-lattice tower manufacturer in the world with approximately 1,02,000 MT of annual production capacity. The company is also executing EPC works for several transmission lines in the region.

Information Technology / Business Process Outsourcing

Zensar Technologies

Zensar Technologies is a global information technology services and business process outsourcer headquartered in Pune, India. It offers a range of integrated information technology (IT) and BPO products and services to Fortune 500 clients. Zensar has a marketing presence in the US, Europe, Asia Pacific, and South Africa. The company has operations and a customer base across all continents, including software development centers at Pune, Hyderabad, and Bangalore in India, Gdańsk, Poland, and the Middle East.

Zensar service areas include application support and development, application portfolio management, testing, enterprise collaboration and content management, enterprise application integration, business intelligence and data warehousing. Zensar's core competency is application modernization, using Zensar's SBP framework. Zensar is a CMMI Level 5 Company with activity that spans utilities, retail and distribution, banking, financial services and insurance, manufacturing, and telecommunications.

Specialty

Raychem RPG
Raychem RPG Limited is a 50:50 joint venture between RPG and US group TE Connectivity (formerly Tyco Electronics), and is involved in engineering products and services catering to the infrastructure segments of the economy such as power, telecommunications, hydrocarbon, oil and gas, and water. It manufactures cable accessories up to 245 kV, and connector systems, viz. shear bolt, low power-loss wedge connectors, insulation piercing, deep step indentation, and bolted, up to 1200kV. Raychem Zero-Halogen Heat-shrink technology is widely used in Metro underground applications. Raychem has an innovation centre in Halol, Gujarat, wherein research on polymers for electrical applications, connection technologies, and power electronics, take place. The thrust is on solutions to the power sector, to lower the Aggregate Technical & Commercial losses (AT & C). Raychem RPG has introduced Delta-transformer technology, which has lower No-load losses, as compared to conventional transformers.

RPG Life Sciences

RPG Life Sciences (RPGLS) is an Indian pharmaceutical company, formerly known as Searle (India) Ltd. Its three major sources of business are manufacturing and marketing of bulk drugs, also known as API (Active Pharmaceutical Ingredients), pharmaceutical formulation and fermentation & biotechnology. It is represented in more than 30 countries by means of strategic partnership and joint ventures. It has global partnership for dossiers/DMF in Europe and Canada, artificial sugar in UK, NSAID in Europe, and formulations in Asia, Canada and Europe.

RPGLS offers services like marketing partnership, NDDS development, development of non-infringing process technologies, and P2P and/or contract manufacturing to its global partners. In 2012, it was named as one of India's best places to work by the Great Places to Work institute.

Harrisons Malayalam Limited

Harrisons Malayalam is an agricultural business corporation with a history that goes back to over 150 years. It cultivates between 14'000 ha – 26'000 ha (information varies) of its own land and processes products from other farmlands in its neighbourhood. In addition to banana, cardamom, cocoa, coffee, coconut, pepper, and vanilla, its primary products are rubber, tea, and pineapple. Harrisons Malayalam is the largest producer of pineapples in India, the largest producer of tea in South India, and is the largest employer in the region. It employs around 13,000 people in rural Kerala, and more than 100,000 people are dependent on the company for their livelihood.

Venture Capital

RPG Ventures 
It is the venture capital arm of the RPG group, which makes investments in innovative startups in different sectors like health and wellness, technology, automotive, infrastructure, and project management. In October 2016, it invested an undisclosed amount in Bangalore-based bot-mitigation and management startup, ShieldSquare, through a series-A funding. In September 2017, it invested US$1 million in Pune-based elderly-care e-commerce platform, Seniority. In November 2017, it backed the Pune-based online pharmacy, Medsonway Solutions with US$600,000.

References

Further reading 
 

 
Companies based in Mumbai
Privately held companies of India
Conglomerate companies established in 1979
Multinational companies headquartered in India
Manufacturing companies established in 1979
Indian companies established in 1979
1979 establishments in Maharashtra
Goenka Family
Companies established in 1820